In physics, geometrothermodynamics (GTD) is a formalism developed in 2007 by Hernando Quevedo to describe the properties of thermodynamic systems in terms of concepts of differential geometry.

Consider a  thermodynamic system in the framework of classical equilibrium thermodynamics. The states of thermodynamic equilibrium are considered as points of an abstract equilibrium space in which a Riemannian metric can be introduced in several ways. In particular, one can introduce Hessian metrics like the Fisher information metric, the Weinhold metric, the Ruppeiner metric and others, whose components are calculated as the Hessian of a particular thermodynamic potential. 

Another possibility is to introduce metrics which are independent of the thermodynamic potential, a property which is shared by all thermodynamic systems in classical thermodynamics. Since a change of thermodynamic potential is equivalent to a Legendre transformation, and Legendre transformations do not act in the equilibrium space, it is necessary to introduce an auxiliary space to correctly handle the Legendre transformations. This is the so-called thermodynamic phase space. If the phase space is equipped with a Legendre invariant Riemannian metric, a smooth map can be introduced that induces a thermodynamic metric in the equilibrium manifold. The thermodynamic metric can then be used with different thermodynamic potentials without changing the geometric properties of the equilibrium manifold.  One expects the geometric properties of the equilibrium manifold to be related to the macroscopic physical properties. 

The details of this relation can be summarized in three main points:
Curvature is a measure of the thermodynamical interaction.
Curvature singularities correspond to curvature phase transitions. 
Thermodynamic geodesics correspond to quasi-static processes.

Geometric aspects

The main ingredient of GTD is a (2n + 1)-dimensional manifold  
with coordinates , where  is an arbitrary thermodynamic potential, are the
extensive variables, and  the intensive variables. It is also
possible to introduce in a canonical manner the fundamental
degrees of freedom of the system, and is invariant with respect to
Legendre transformations

 

where  is any disjoint decomposition of the set of indices ,
the total Legendre transformation and the identity, respectively.
It is also assumed that in  
there exists a metric  which is also
invariant with respect to Legendre transformations. The triad
 defines a Riemannian contact manifold which is
called the thermodynamic phase space (phase manifold). The space of
thermodynamic equilibrium states (equilibrium manifold)  is an
n-dimensional Riemannian submanifold 
induced by a smooth map ,
i.e. , with 
The manifold  is naturally equipped
with the Riemannian metric . The purpose of GTD is
related to the thermodynamic properties of a system with fundamental
thermodynamic equation .
The condition of invariance with respect total Legendre transformations leads to the metrics

 

 

The metrics  and  have been used to describe thermodynamic systems with first and second order phase transitions, respectively. The most general metric which is invariant with respect to partial Legendre transformations is

 

The components of the corresponding metric for the equilibrium manifold  can be computed as

Applications
GTD has been applied to describe laboratory systems like the ideal gas, van der Waals gas, the Ising model, etc., more exotic systems like black holes in different gravity theories, in the context of relativistic cosmology, and to describe chemical reactions
.

References

Branches of thermodynamics
Geometry